Bina Das (24 August 1911—1986) was an Indian revolutionary and nationalist from West Bengal.

Biography

Early life and education 
Das was the daughter of a Brahmo teacher, Beni Madhab Das and a social worker, Sarala Devi. Her elder sister Kalyani Das was also a freedom fighter.

Das was a student of St. John's Diocesan Girls' Higher Secondary School and Bethune College, Calcutta.

Participation in India's freedom struggle 
Das was a member of Chhatri Sangha, a semi-revolutionary organisation for women in Kolkata. On 6 February 1932, she attempted to assassinate the Bengal Governor Stanley Jackson, in the Convocation Hall of the University of Calcutta. The revolver was supplied by another freedom fighter Kamala Das Gupta. She fired five shots but failed. Her confession, which ran to five pages long and was written in English, was censored by the British colonial administration, but still found itself widely circulated. In it, she wrote that:"My object was to die, and if to die, to die nobly fighting against this despotic system of Government, which has kept my country in perpetual subjection to its infinite shame and endless suffering – and fighting in a way which cannot but tell... I have been thinking – is life worth living in an India so subjected to wrong, and continually groaning under the tyranny of a foreign Government, or is it not better to make one's supreme protest against it by offering one's life away? Would not the immolation of a daughter of India and of a son of England awaken India to the sin of its acquiescence to its continued state of subjection and England to the iniquities of its proceedings?" The Special Tribunal convened to judge her sentenced her to nine years of rigorous imprisonment on charges of attempted murder under section 307 of the Indian Penal Code.

After her release from jail, she became active in the Congress, participated in the Quit India Movement and was imprisoned till 1945.  After independence, she won the provincial assembly, but the Bina Das left the Congress due to ideological differences.

In 1947, she married Jatish Chandra Bhaumik, an Indian independence movement activist of the Jugantar group.

Though she didn't join the Communist Party, the revolutionary Bina Das was attracted to socialist and communist ideals. She believed that Marxism should be re-established according to the needs of the country.

She was a friend of Suhasini Ganguly, a freedom fighter.

Death 
After the death of her husband, Das led a lonely life in Rishikesh and died in anonymity. Her dead body was recovered from the roadside on 26 December 1986 in a partially decomposed state. It was found by the passing crowd. The police were informed and it took them a month to determine her identity. An alternate report by the current relatives of Bina Das says she was found unconscious at a bus stand and was taken to hospital by the police, where she died the next day. This was stated in a documentary on Bina Das broadcast on 26 December 2021 on DD Bangla.

Legacy and awards 
Her sister Kalyani Bhattacharjee edited a book called Bengal Speaks (published in 1944), and dedicated it to her.

Das won the Padma Shri award in 1960 for her "Social Work".

In 2012, Das and Pritilata Waddedar were conferred the Graduation Certificates posthumously by Calcutta University, nearly 80 years after British government withheld them.

Works
Das wrote two autobiographical works in Bengali: Shrinkhal Jhankar and Pitridhan.

References

External links
 Biography by Bharatiya Vidya Bhavan
 
 Bengalee women
 Statement before the Special Tribunal of Calcutta High Court by Bina Das
 St. John's Diocesan Girls' Higher Secondary School Official Website

1911 births
1986 deaths
Revolutionary movement for Indian independence
Brahmos
Indian National Congress politicians from West Bengal
Bethune College alumni
University of Calcutta alumni
Recipients of the Padma Shri in social work
Social workers
20th-century Indian women politicians
20th-century Indian politicians
20th-century Indian educators
People from Krishnagar
Women in West Bengal politics
Social workers from West Bengal
20th-century women educators
Prisoners and detainees of British India
Female revolutionaries
Indian independence activists from West Bengal